Corbett Eric Cresswell (3 August 1932 – 19 May 2017) was an English footballer who played as a centre half.

Early and personal life
Born in Birkenhead, his father was England international full-back Warney Cresswell, and his uncle was Frank Cresswell. He was married with two daughters and grandchildren.

Career
Cresswell joined Evenwood Town in 1951, and later played for Bishop Auckland in the 1950s, winning the FA Amateur Cup three times. After a transfer to Manchester United fell through, he played in the Football League for Carlisle United. He finished his career with Horden Colliery Welfare.

Cresswell earned 10 caps for the England national amateur football team between 1955 and 1957.

Later life
He later worked in the furniture business. He died on 19 May 2017, at the age of 84.

References

1932 births
2017 deaths
English footballers
Spennymoor Town F.C. players
Bishop Auckland F.C. players
Carlisle United F.C. players
Darlington Town F.C. players
English Football League players
Association football defenders